The 57th running of the Milan–San Remo cycling classic was held on March 20, 1966. The race was won by 20-year old Belgian Eddy Merckx, the first of seven victories of the Cannibal in the monument race.

Summary
After the Turchino, 17 riders were in the breakaway, but they were joined by a large peloton before the Poggio. Raymond Poulidor, looking for a second win, broke clear on the Poggio, but was caught before entering San Remo. A large group rushed to the finish on the Via Roma, with Italian champion Michele Dancelli leading out the sprint. Young Belgian Eddy Merckx, on his way to cycling legend, beat Italian Adriano Durante by centimeters, winning his very first international classic. At 20, he became the youngest winner of the Classicissima ever. According to legend, his mother in Belgium fainted with emotion in front of the television.

Results

References

Milan–San Remo
Milan-San Remo, 1966
Milan-San Remo
March 1966 sports events in Europe
1966 Super Prestige Pernod